Alfred Pike (“Ted”) Bissonnet (1914–1979) was a Canadian diplomat. He was born in Stanstead, Quebec, the son of Alfred Joseph Bissonnet, an industrialist and Member of the Québec National Assembly from Stanstead, and Josephine Pike of neighbouring Derby Line, Vermont, and studied at Stanstead College and Bishop's University. Bissonnet joined the Black Watch regiment and served overseas in the UK, Belgium and the Netherlands during World War II. He was wounded in the Netherlands and during his recovery in the UK applied to and later  joined the Department of Trade and Commerce in 1946 following the end of the war.

As a Trade Commissioner he served in Athens, Rome, Karachi, Stockholm and Tokyo, before returning to Ottawa in 1963, where he was subsequently appointed Director of the Trade Commissioner Service.

In 1968 he transferred to the Department of External Affairs where he was appointed as Ambassador Extraordinary and Plenipotentiary to Indonesia in 1968, and then in 1970-78 concurrently as Ambassador Extraordinary and Plenipotentiary to Argentina, Paraguay and Uruguay.

In Rome in 1949 he met and married Marcella Despujols, daughter of the French artist Jean Despujols and granddaughter of Admiral :it: Lamberto Vannutelli. They had three children, Maria-Luisa (1949–51), Richard (1953-) and Catherine (1957-).

References

External links 
 Foreign Affairs and International Trade Canada Complete List of Posts

1914 births
1979 deaths
Ambassadors of Canada to Indonesia
Ambassadors of Canada to Paraguay
Ambassadors of Canada to Uruguay
Ambassadors of Canada to Argentina
Bishop's University alumni
Stanstead College alumni